Dolichoderus shattucki is a species of ant in the genus Dolichoderus. Described by Mackay in 1993, the species is endemic to Ecuador and Panama.

References

Dolichoderus
Hymenoptera of North America
Hymenoptera of South America
Insects described in 1993